Flight 311 may refer to:

 Aero Flight 311, plane crash in 1961
 Thai Airways International Flight 311, plane crash in 1992

0311